Cassel is a surname. Notable people with the surname include:

Christine K. Cassel, American physician
David Cassel, German historian and Jewish theologian
Erik Cassel, Co-founder of Roblox
Ernest Cassel,  British capitalist
Felix Cassel, British Judge Advocate-General
 (Karl) Gustav Cassel, 1866–1945, Swedish economist
Hartwig Cassel, German chess promoter
Henry B. Cassel, U.S. congressman from Pennsylvania
Jack Cassel, Major League Baseball player
Jean-Pierre Cassel, French actor
Jochen Cassel (born 1981), German badminton player
Marcus Cassel, American football player
Matt Cassel, American football quarterback
Paulus Stephanus Cassel, 19th century Jewish convert to Christianity
Sandra Cassel, American actress
Seymour Cassel (1935–2019), American actor
Vincent Cassel, French actor

Fictional characters
Gil Cassel, a character in the Star Wars: Legacy graphic novel series
Jared Cassel, a character in the Star Wars: Legacy graphic novel series
Jory Cassel, a character from the "A Song of Ice and Fire" fantasy series
Ser Rodrik Cassel, a character from the "A Song of Ice and Fire" fantasy series